Billa Flint (February 9, 1805 – June 15, 1894) was a businessman and political figure in Ontario. He was a Liberal member of the Senate of Canada from 1867 to 1894.

He was born in Elizabethtown (later Brockville) in Upper Canada and dropped out of school after six weeks to work for his father as a clerk. In 1829, unhappy with the sale of liquor at his father's hotel, he moved to Belleville and set up his own business there. In the same year, he also founded a temperance society there. In 1836, he was appointed magistrate and also became president of the Board of Police. He was elected to the Legislative Assembly of the Province of Canada in 1847 for Hastings and, in 1854, for Hastings South. In 1863, he was elected to the Legislative Council for Trent division and served until Confederation when he was appointed to the Senate. In 1866, he served as mayor of Belleville. He served over 20 years on the council for Hastings County and was warden for the county in 1873.

His business had expanded from the sale of goods into the harvesting and sale of timber and the operation of warehouses and wharfs for storing and transporting goods. He also established towns along the Skootamatta River, with mills and factories, at Troy (later Actinolite) and Flint's Mills (now Flinton). He purchased mills at York Mills, later named Bancroft after his wife's mother's maiden name. Her name was Elizabeth Ann Clement (née Bancroft). He also helped promote steamships on Lake Ontario and railway links in the region. Although forceful and opinionated, he also donated land for schools and churches.

He died at Ottawa in 1894, while serving as member of the Senate.

Flint wrote a series of articles about the early days of Belleville which were published in the newspapers of the time.

External links 
Biography at the Dictionary of Canadian Biography Online

1805 births
1894 deaths
Members of the Legislative Assembly of the Province of Canada from Canada West
Members of the Legislative Council of the Province of Canada
Canadian senators from Ontario
Liberal Party of Canada senators
People from Brockville